Sungkyunkwan Law School is one of the professional graduate schools of Sungkyunkwan University, located in Seoul, South Korea. Founded in 2009, it is one of the founding law schools in South Korea and is one of the larger schools with each class in the three-year J.D. program having approximately 120 students.

Programs

References

Website 
 Official Website

Sungkyunkwan University
Law schools in South Korea
Educational institutions established in 2009
2009 establishments in South Korea